Ibrahima Baldé may refer to:

 Ibrahima Baldé (footballer, born 1989), Senegalese football forward for Boluspor
 Ibrahima Baldé (footballer, born 2003), French football forward for Annecy

See also
 Ibraima Baldé (born 1986), Bissau-Guinean former football striker